The 2011 edition of the women's basketball tournament of the African Games was the 10th, organized by FIBA Africa and played under the auspices of FIBA, the basketball sport governing body. The tournament was held from 9 to 17 September 2011 in Maputo, Mozambique, contested by 10 national teams and won by Nigeria.

Draw

Squads

Preliminary round

Times given below are in UTC+2.

Group A

Group B

Knockout stage

Championship bracket

Quarterfinals

Semifinals

Bronze medal game

Gold medal game

5–8th place classification

7th place match

5th place match

9th place match

Final standings

Awards

All-Tournament Team

See also
2011 FIBA Africa Championship

References

Basketball at the 2011 All-Africa Games